Bill McCay (born April 6, 1951)  is an American author and has written over seventy books in total, mostly media tie-ins.

Series Contributions

Raven League (With Alex Simmons) 
McCay co-wrote two novels in the Raven League series with Alex Simmons:  

 Buffalo Bill Wanted! (2006)
 Sherlock Holmes Is Missing! (2007)

Mage Knight
McCay contributed the first novel in the Mage Knight wargaming tie-in:
 Rebel Thunder (2003)

Tom Clancy's Net Force Explorers
McCay contributed several novels in the Tom Clancy's Net Force Explorers series:
 Cyberspy (1999) with Tom Clancy and Steve R. Pieczenik
 The Great Race (1999)
 Private Lives (2000)
 Duel Identity (2000)
 Cold Case (2001)

Nintendo Adventure Books
McCay contributed two books to the Nintendo Adventure Books series:
 Monster Mix-Up (1991)
 Koopa Capers (1991)

Stan Lee's Riftworld
 Crossover (1993) 
 Villains (1994)
 Odyssey (1996) with Stan Lee

Star Trek Universe
 Chains of Command (1992) with Eloise Flood

Stargate
Extended novelization of the original film, based on Roland Emmerich's backstory notes.
 Rebellion (1995)
 Retaliation (1996)
 Retribution (1997)
 Reconnaissance (1998)
 Resistance (1999)

Tom Swift
McCay contributed two books to the Tom Swift series, writing under the house pseudonym Victor Appleton.
 The Black Dragon (1991) [as by Victor Appleton]
 The Negative Zone (1991) [as by Victor Appleton]

References

External links

American science fiction writers
Stargate
Living people
20th-century American novelists
21st-century American novelists
American male novelists
20th-century American male writers
21st-century American male writers
1951 births